Ice hockey in Armenia is governed by the Ice Hockey Federation of Armenia.

History

The Armenian Hockey League was founded in 2000. Armenian men's and junior national teams have participated at the IIHF World Championships. The country has been a member of the International Ice Hockey Federation since 22 September 1999.

See also

 Ice hockey by country
 Sport in Armenia
 Yerevan Figure Skating and Hockey Sports School

References

External links
Country profile on IIHF.com